Ken Nelson may refer to:

 Ken Nelson (American record producer) (1911–2008)
 Ken Nelson (British record producer) (born 1959)
 Kenneth Nelson (1930–1993), American actor
 Ken Nelson (businessman) (born 1962), British businessman
 Ken G. Nelson (born 1936), American politician in the Minnesota House of Representatives